Dipeptidyl peptidase 9 is an enzyme that in humans is encoded by the DPP9 gene.

This gene encodes a protein that is a member of the S9B family in clan SC of the serine proteases. The protein has been shown to have post-proline dipeptidyl aminopeptidase activity, cleaving Xaa-Pro dipeptides from the N-termini of proteins. Although the activity of this protein is similar to that of dipeptidyl peptidase 4 (DPP4), it does not appear to be membrane bound.

In general, dipeptidyl peptidases appear to be involved in the regulation of the activity of their substrates and have been linked to a variety of diseases including type 2 diabetes, obesity and cancer. Several transcript variants of this gene have been described but not fully characterized. More specifically, DPP9 interacts with the NLRP1 protein and affects the level of activation of the NLRP1 inflammasome. This function involves binding to a complex of full length NLRP1 and a proinflammatory fragment of NLRP1 after activation by autocleavage. A similar mechanism allows DPP9 to regulate the CARD8 inflammasome.

This gene has also been linked to severe COVID-19.

Medical Genetics
Mutations in NLRP1 that block DPP9 interaction lead to a rare Mendelian condition called Autoinflammation with Arthritis and Dyskeratosis A homozygous recessive syndrome dubbed Hatipoğlu syndrome is attributed to mutations in DPP9 with phenotype of failure to thrive, skin manifestations, pancytopenia, and susceptibility to infections. Genetic analysis of knockout alleles of DPP9 in mice and zebrafish showed a severe phenotype that could be rescued by mutation of NLPR1 in the same report.

References

Further reading